L'oro del mondo (Italian for The gold of the world) is a 1968 Italian "musicarello" film directed by Aldo Grimaldi and starring Al Bano and Romina Power.

Plot

Cast 

 Romina Power as  Lorena Vivaldi
Al Bano as   Carlo Carrera
Linda Christian as  Mother of Lorena 
 Carlo Giordana as   Giorgio Castelli
Franco Franchi as   Franco
Ciccio Ingrassia as   Ciccio
Nino Taranto as   Filippo Pugliese
 Antonella Steni as  Pugliese's Wife
Enrico Montesano as  Francesco Alessandroni 
 Carla Vistarini as   Student 
Carlo Taranto as   Concessionario
 Consalvo Dell'Arti as   Giorgio's Father
Nino Terzo as  Usher
Ignazio Leone as Accountant Ferretti

See also        
 List of Italian films of 1968

References

External links

Musicarelli
1968 musical comedy films
1968 films
Films directed by Aldo Grimaldi
Films with screenplays by Aldo Grimaldi
1960s Italian-language films
1960s Italian films